Zopyrus (fl. 522 BC-500 BC) was a Persian nobleman mentioned in Herodotus' Histories.

He was son of Megabyzus I, who helped Darius I in his ascension. According to Herodotus, when Babylon revolted against the rule of Darius I, Zopyrus devised a plan to regain control of the vital city. By cutting off his own nose and ears, and then having himself whipped, he arrived at the court of Darius. Upon presenting himself to Darius, the king stood up from his throne, shocked at the state of Zopyrus, and asked who had done this to him. Zopyrus then said that he had mutilated himself. Darius asked "Are you fool enough to think that the mutilation of your body can hasten our victory? When you did that to yourself you must have taken leave of your senses." At this Zopyrus explained his plan, he would go before the people of Babylon and proclaim himself an exile and deserter of the Persian army punished by Darius himself. Seeing that the mutilation had already been done, Darius agreed and so Zopyrus put his plan into action. The Babylonian soldiers allowed him passage into the city and brought him before the chief princes of Babylon. The Babylonians, seeing a man of his high rank mutilated, took his contrived story as absolute fact. Gaining the Babylonians' trust, Zopyrus soon became commander-in-chief of their army, allowing him to weaken the city's defenses. He then led soldiers under his charge into an ambush where Darius slaughtered them. The gates undefended, Darius' armies victoriously reconquered the city. Zopyrus was made satrap and Darius "rewarded him with the highest honours, giving him every year the sort of gifts which are most prized amongst the Persians".

The veracity of the account is debatable. First, the story resembles Homer's description of Odysseus, who spied on Troy after mutilating himself. Second, no cuneiform sources mention Zopyrus as satrap of Babylon.

According to Herodotus, Zopyrus had a son named Megabyzus who "deserted from the Persian army and came to Athens".

References

External links
Livius.org: Zopyrus

Military leaders of the Achaemenid Empire
6th-century BC Iranian people
Officials of Darius the Great